Passaloglyphus is a genus of mites in the family Acaridae.

Species
 Passaloglyphus rosickyi Mahunka & Samsinak, 1972

References

Acaridae